Cuauhtémoc Municipality  may refer to

Cuauhtémoc Municipality, Chihuahua
Cuauhtémoc Municipality, Colima
Cuauhtémoc Municipality, Zacatecas

Compound municipality names with "Cuauhtémoc"
Ixcateopan de Cuauhtémoc (municipality), Guerrero
Rojas de Cuauhtémoc (municipality), Oaxaca
Santa Ana Cuauhtémoc (municipality), Oaxaca
Tepeyahualco de Cuauhtémoc (municipality), Puebla

See also
Cuauhtémoc (disambiguation)

Municipality name disambiguation pages